Daniel Kelaart (born 6 January 1986) is an Australian singer-songwriter and record producer. Daniel is the frontman of the pop rock band Remission Theory, but has also launched a career as an independent record producer where he has produced, engineered, mixed or written tracks for various bands such as For Our Hero, The Paperkites, Simple Plan, Antiskeptic, Declan Sykes, Michael Paynter, Have You Seen This Boy, Hometown, Dylan Joel, and Delamare.

External links
 
 

1986 births
Australian singer-songwriters
Living people
21st-century Australian singers
21st-century Australian male singers
Australian male singer-songwriters